Craniosynostosis–anal anomalies–porokeratosis syndrome (also known as "CAP syndrome") is a cutaneous condition inherited in an autosomal recessive fashion.

See also 
 Cerebral dysgenesis–neuropathy–ichthyosis–keratoderma syndrome
 List of cutaneous conditions

References

External links 

Genodermatoses
Syndromes